Puikule Manor is a manor house in Brīvzemnieki Parish, Limbaži Municipality the historical region of Vidzeme, in northern Latvia. Built in Tudor Neo-Gothic style in the 1870s, it now houses the Puikule primary school.

See also
List of palaces and manor houses in Latvia

References

External links
  Puikule Manor

Manor houses in Latvia
Kreis Wolmar
Limbaži Municipality
Vidzeme